The Visitors is a 1972 American drama film directed by Elia Kazan and starring Patrick McVey. It was entered into the 1972 Cannes Film Festival.  Kazan used an article written by Daniel Lang for The New Yorker in 1969, and Lang's subsequent book Casualties of War, as a jumping-off point for this film.

Plot
Bill Schmidt and his long-term girlfriend Martha Wayne and their young son Hal live in a small Connecticut farmhouse owned by Martha's overbearing father. One snowy winter Saturday, two of Bill's ex-army buddies, Mike and Tony, arrive. A few years ago, they had all served together in Vietnam in the same platoon but later ended up on opposite sides of a court-martial. Bill has never told his girlfriend what happened in Vietnam nor at the court-martial. The story slowly unfolds. Under orders in Vietnam not to take any prisoners, and faced with potentially hostile civilians who might attack them if left behind, Mike kills a civilian after raping her. Bill testifies against him and Mike is sent to the stockade (military prison) for two years. He is angry. There is sexual tension between Mike and Martha. The tension builds and culminates in a fight and a rape.

Cast
 Patrick McVey as Harry Wayne
 Patricia Joyce as Martha Wayne
 James Woods as Bill Schmidt
 Steve Railsback as Mike Nickerson
 Chico Martínez as Tony Rodrigues

See also
 o.k., a 1970 film also depicting the Incident on Hill 192
 Casualties of War, a 1989 film also depicting the Incident on Hill 192

References

External links

1972 films
1972 drama films
1970s English-language films
American drama films
Films directed by Elia Kazan
Films set in Connecticut
Vietnam War films
United Artists films
1970s American films